Madingo-Kayes is a town lying at the mouth of the Kouilou River on the Atlantic Ocean of the Republic of the Congo.  It lies on the edge of the coastal rainforest.

Kouilou Department
Populated places in the Republic of the Congo